Þórður Þórðarson (born 10 April 1972) is an Icelandic former footballer who played as a goalkeeper. He was most recently the manager of Úrvalsdeild side ÍA, from 2009 to 2013. Þórður won one cap for the Iceland national football team in 1996, coming on as a substitute for Kristján Finnbogason in the 2–1 friendly win against Cyprus.

Þórður spent the majority of his playing career in Iceland with ÍA, KA and Valur, playing more than 150 league matches in total. During the 1999 and 2000 seasons he played in Sweden with IFK Norrköping, where he made 13 appearances.

References
 
 

1972 births
Living people
Thordur Thordarson
Thordur Thordarson
Thordur Thordarson
Association football goalkeepers
Allsvenskan players
Thordur Thordarson
IFK Norrköping players
Thordur Thordarson
Thordur Thordarson
Thordur Thordarson
Thordur Thordarson
Expatriate footballers in Sweden
Íþróttabandalag Akraness managers